Northwest Metalfest is a compilation album of songs by ten different Seattle-area metal bands, first released in 1984 by Ground Zero Records in the U.S. and Steamhammer Records in Germany.

Track listing
The length listed is taken from the CD edition.

Personnel

Bands 
Lipstick
Paul Passarelli – vocals
Brock Graue – guitar
Brett Miller – bass
Jeff Cardelli – drums

Open Fire
Greg Costa – vocals
Phil See – guitar, keyboard
Bob Fisher – guitar
Mark Stella – bass
Kevin Merriam – drums

Koda Khan
Bill Ackron – vocals
Doug Roberts – guitar
Cory Sandahl – bass
Jay Roberts – drums

Overlord
Steve Van Liew – vocals
Glen Logan – guitar
Kurt Lofstrom – guitar
Doug Blake – bass
Kenny Kubsen – drums

Rottweiller
Paul Crisman – vocals
Michael Winston – guitar
Tim Wolfe – bass
Doug Marrapodi – drums

Bondage Boys
Vaun Hammer – vocals
Geode V. Winson – guitar
Rexx D’Le’Roxx – bass
Father Onray – drums

Sato
Dean Jeffries – vocals
Terry Lee – guitar
Ken Kramer – guitar
Mike Starr – bass
Dave Jensen – drums

Strike
Joe Milner – vocals
Gregg Stock – guitar
Scott Piteo – bass
Ken Mary – drums

Mace
Vence Larose – vocals, drums
Dave Hillis – guitar
Kirk Verhay – bass

Metal Church
David Wayne – vocals
Kurdt Vanderhoof – guitar
Craig Wells – guitar
Duke Erickson – bass
Kirk Arrington – drums

Production 
Individual tracks/bands
Produced and engineered by Tom Hall (A1); Open Fire, David Thompson, and Brad Spur (A2); Koda Khan and Gordy Kjellberg (A3); Overlord and Tom Bertoldi (A4); Bondage Boys and Don Dodge (B1); Sato and Tom Hall (B2); Mace and Tom Bertoldi (B4); Metal Church and Richard Rogers (B5)
Produced by Goldy McJohn, Gordy Kjellberg, Rottweiler (A5); Gregg Stock (B3)
Engineered by Terry Date (B3)
Remixing by Jack Barr (B5)
Band photos by Patricia Ridenour (Lipstick); Lynn DeBon (Open Fire); Greg Cass (Koda Khan); Julianne Anderson (Overlord); Mike Crisman (Rottweiler); Craig Holt (Bondage Boys); Ashly Bexten (Sato, Mace); Saulis Pempe (Strike); Randy Butler (Metal Church)
Stage Managing by John Stocks (Open Fire)

Album
Executive produced by Jeff Gilbert and Willie Mackay
Sequencing and equalization by Tom Hall
Mastered by Ron Luder
Cover art by Vern White
Logo design – Stacy Sidener
Liner notes by Glen Boyd
Album title by Brett Miller
Inspiration by Diane Harris and Kim Harris

Band releases
Koda Khan
Tales from the Darkside 83–88  (2016)
Overlord
Broken Toys  (1982)
Broken Toys: Expanded Deluxe Edition (2017)
Rottweiller
Screams of the Innocent (1985)
Rage of War (2004)
Sato
Leather Warriors - Sato Anthology 82/86  (2017)
Strike
Strike  (1984)
Mace
Process of Elimination (1985)
The Evil in Good (1987)
Metal Church
Metal Church discography

References
 

1984 compilation albums
Heavy metal compilation albums